Stenson is a surname. See "Stinson" for its origin. Notable people with the surname include:

 Bobo Stenson (born 1944), Swedish piano player
 Carley Stenson (born 1982), English actress and singer
 Dernell Stenson (1978–2003), US baseball player
 Enda Stenson, Gaelic football referee
 Fran Stenson (born 2001), English footballer
 Fred Stenson (politician) (1914–1990), former Canadian MP for Peterborough
 Fred Stenson (writer) (born 1951), writer of historical fiction from Alberta
 Ged Stenson (born 1959), English footballer
 Henrik Stenson (born 1976), Swedish golfer
 John Stenson (born 1949), English footballer
 Michael Thomas Stenson (1838–1912), Canadian politician
 Tyler Stenson, singer/songwriter from Oregon
 William Stenson (1770–1861), mining engineer

See also
 Stenson, Derbyshire, hamlet south of Derby on the Trent and Mersey Canal in the UK